Al-Mahdi Ibrahim (died June/July 1284) was an imam of the Zaidi state in Yemen whose imamate lasted from 1272 to 1276.

Proclamation of the imamate

The late 13th century was the high tide of the rule of the Rasulid Dynasty in Yemen. In the northern highland, Zaidi nobles tried to maintain a position as imams, with varying success. In July 1272, Ibrahim bin Ahmad Taj ad-Din bin Badr ad-Din, a nephew of the former imam al-Mansur al-Hasan, proclaimed his bid for the imamate as al-Mahdi Ibrahim. His call was heeded by the population in Hadur, Banu'r-Ra'i, Banu Shihab, and other places. He entered Banu'r-Ra'i and Banu Shihab with seven followers and then led the Friday prayer among 7,000 people. Warfare soon flared up between the Zaidis and the Rasulid authorities. The able Rasulid commander in San'a, Alam ad-Din Sinjar al-Sha'bi, defeated the Zaidis in 1273, and in the following year, al-Mahdi Ibrahim made peace with Sultan al-Muzaffar Yusuf.

Abortive seizure of San'a

However, in August 1275, a corps of rebellious slave soldiers seized San'a, and invited the imam and the Zaidi strongman Sarim ad-Din Da'ud to reside in the city. Al-Mahdi Ibrahim accepted and was led to the Cathedral Mosque of San'a. The Zaidi leaders drew up plans of advancing further to Dhamar. Nevertheless, al-Muzaffar Yusuf reacted quickly and moved against San'a with an army. Sarim ad-Din Da'ud took a position on a summit, but his troops were heavily defeated, and he barely slipped away. The imam was besieged in a fortress. Eventually, he was captured after many of his followers were killed. The Rasulid sultan treated his prisoner with great courtesy and gave him a house to live in Ta'izz. He stayed there until his death in 1284. Personally, although generally unsuccessful in his political affairs, al-Mahdi Ibrahim was acclaimed as a brave warrior, famous horseman, and a good poet.

See also

 Imams of Yemen
 History of Yemen

References

Zaydi imams of Yemen
1284 deaths
Year of birth unknown
13th century in Yemen
13th-century Arabs
Rassid dynasty